Digital Cinema Initiatives, LLC (DCI) is a consortium of major motion picture studios, formed to establish specifications for a common systems architecture for digital cinema systems.

The organization was formed in March 2002 by Metro-Goldwyn-Mayer, Paramount Pictures, Sony Pictures Entertainment, 20th Century Fox, Universal Studios, The Walt Disney Company and Warner Bros.

The primary purpose of DCI is to establish and document specifications for an open architecture for digital cinema that ensures a uniform and high level of technical performance, reliability and quality.  By establishing a common set of content requirements, distributors, studios, exhibitors, d-cinema manufacturers and vendors can be assured of interoperability and compatibility. Because of the relationship of DCI to many of Hollywood's key studios, conformance to DCI's specifications is considered a requirement by software developers or equipment manufacturers targeting the digital cinema market.

Specification
On July 20, 2005, DCI released Version 1.0 of its "Digital Cinema System Specification", commonly referred to as the "DCI Specification". The document describes overall system requirements and specifications for digital cinema. Between March 28, 2006, and March 21, 2007, DCI issued 148 errata to Version 1.0.

DCI released Version 1.1 of the DCI Specification on April 12, 2007, incorporating the previous 148 errata into the DCI Specification. On April 15, 2007, at the annual NAB Digital Cinema Summit, DCI announced the new version, as well as some future plans. They released the "Stereoscopic Digital Cinema Addendum" to begin to establish 3-D technical specifications in response to the popularity of 3-D stereoscopic films. It was also announced "which studios would take over the leadership roles in DCI after the current leadership term expires at the end of September."

Subsequently, between August 27, 2007, and February 1, 2008, DCI issued 100 errata to Version 1.1. So, DCI released Version 1.2 of the DCI Specification on March 7, 2008, again incorporating the previous 100 errata into the specification document. An additional 96 errata were issued by August 30, 2012, so a revised Version 1.2 incorporating those additional errata was approved on October 10, 2012. DCI approved DCI Specification Version 1.3 on June 27, 2018, integrating the 45 errata issued to the previous version into a new document.

On July 20, 2020, fifteen years to the day after Version 1.0, DCI issued a new DCI Specification Version 1.4 that assimilated 29 errata issued since Version 1.3. On October 13, 2021, DCI approved a new DCI Specification Version 1.4.1 that integrated the 23 errata that had been issued to DCI Specification Version 1.4. For the convenience of users, DCI also created an online HTML version of DCI Specification, Version 1.4.1.  Due to the HTML conversion process, the footnotes in the DCSS now appear as endnotes. The PDF version contains pagination and page numbers whereas the HTML version does not.

DCI Specification Version 1.4.2, dated June 15, 2022, includes revisions and refinements respecting Object-Based Audio Essence (OBAE), also known as Immersive Audio Bitstream (IAB). Version 1.4.2 also implements post-show log record collection utilizing SMPTE 430-17 SMS-OMB Communications Protocol Specification. Additionally, Version 1.4.2 incorporated two prior addenda: the Digital Cinema Object-Based Audio Addendum, dated October 1, 2018 and the Stereoscopic Digital Cinema Addendum, Version 1.0, dated July 11, 2007. Users using Version 1.4.2 no longer need to refer to the separate addenda. Previous DCSS versions are archived on the DCI web site.

Based on many SMPTE and ISO standards, such as JPEG 2000-compressed image and "broadcast wave" PCM/WAV sound, the DCI Specification explains the route to create an entire Digital Cinema Package (DCP) from a raw collection of files known as the Digital Cinema Distribution Master (DCDM), as well as the specifics of its content protection, encryption, and forensic marking.

The DCI Specification also establishes standards for the decoder requirements and the presentation environment itself, such as ambient light levels, pixel aspect and shape, image luminance, white point chromaticity, and those tolerances to be kept.

Even though it specifies what kind of information is required, the DCI Specification does not include specific information about how data within a distribution package is to be formatted. Formatting of this information is defined by the Society of Motion Picture and Television Engineers (SMPTE) digital cinema standards and related documents.

Image and audio capability overview

2D image

 2048×1080 (2K) at 24 frame/s or 48 frame/s, or 4096×2160 (4K) at 24 frame/s
 In 2K, for Scope (2.39:1) presentation 2048×858 pixels of the imager is used
 In 2K, for Flat (1.85:1) presentation 1998×1080 pixels of the imager is used
 In 4K, for Scope (2.39:1) presentation 4096×1716 pixels of the imager is used
 In 4K, for Flat (1.85:1) presentation 3996×2160 pixels of the imager is used
 12 bits per color component (36 bits per pixel) via dual HD-SDI (encrypted)
 10 bits only permitted for 2K at 48 frame/s
 CIE XYZ color space
 TIFF 6.0 container format (one file per frame)
 JPEG 2000 compression
 From 0 to 5 or from 1 to 6 wavelet decomposition levels for 2K or 4K resolutions, respectively
 Compression rate of 4.71 bits/pixel (2K @ 24 frame/s), 2.35 bits/pixel (2K @ 48 frame/s), 1.17 bits/pixel (4K @ 24 frame/s)
 250 Mbit/s maximum image bit rate

Stereoscopic 3D image
 2048×1080 (2K) at 48 frame/s - 24 frame/s per eye (4096×2160 4K not supported)
 In 2K, for Scope (2.39:1) presentation 2048×858 pixels of the imager is used
 In 2K, for Flat (1.85:1) presentation 1998×1080 pixels of the imager is used
 Optionally, in the HD-SDI link only: 10 bit color, YCbCr 4:2:2, each eye in separate stream

Audio
 24 bits per sample, 48 kHz or 96 kHz
 Up to 16 channels
 WAV container, uncompressed PCM

DCI has additionally published a document outlining recommended practice for High Frame Rate digital cinema. This document discloses the following proposed frame rates: 60, 96, and 120 frames per second for 2D at 2K resolution; 48 and 60 for stereoscopic 3D at 2K resolution; 48 and 60 for 2D at 4K resolution. The maximum compressed bit rate for support of all proposed frame rates should be 500 Mbit/s.

Related information
The idea for DCI was originally mooted in late 1999 by Tom McGrath, then COO of Paramount Pictures, who applied to the U.S. Department of Justice for anti-trust waivers to allow the joint cooperation of all seven major motion picture studios.

Universal Pictures made one of the first feature-length DCPs created to DCI specifications, using their film Serenity. Although it was not distributed theatrically, it had one public screening on November 7, 2005, at the USC Entertainment Technology Center's Digital Cinema Laboratory in the Pacific Theatre, Hollywood. Inside Man was Universal's first DCP commercial release, and, in addition to 35mm film distribution, was delivered via hard drive to 20 theatres in the United States along with two trailers.

The Academy Film Archive houses the Digital Cinema Initiatives, LLC Collection, which includes film and digital elements from DCI's Standard Evaluation Material (StEM), a 12-minute production shot on 35mm and 65mm film, created for vendors and standards organizations to test and evaluate image compression and digital projection technologies.

Notes

References

Bibliography
High frame rates digital cinema recommended practice, DCI, 2015 (PDF)

External links
 

Film and video technology
Digital media
The Walt Disney Company
2002 establishments in California
20th Century Studios
Paramount Pictures
Sony Pictures Entertainment
Warner Bros.
Universal Pictures
Mass media companies established in 2002
Communications and media organizations based in the United States